The Northern Football Netball League (formerly known as the Diamond Valley Football League and later Northern Football League) is an Australian sports league based in the Diamond Valley region of suburban Melbourne, Victoria. The league regulates competitions of both sports, Australian rules football and netball in the region.

History 
The league was founded in 1922, originally having six clubs, three of whom still participate. In 1941 the league went into recess for five years as a result of World War II, the competition recommencing in 1946. After the war the league continued to grow.

Formation of Division Two

In 1981 the league was split into two divisions. The top 10 teams at the end of the 1980 season formed Division One (Diamond Creek, Greensborough, Heidelberg West, Lalor, Macelod-Rosanna, Montmorency, North Heidelberg, Reservoir-Lakeside, Templestowe and Watsonia) for the 1981 season. Division Two was formed by the 4 bottom placed teams from the 1980 season (Eltham, Epping, Heidelberg and South Morang) and 4 new teams making their debut (Bundoora, Northcote Park, Reservoir and West Preston) for the 1981 season.

Renaming of the League

The entire DVFL board resigned over the summer of 2006–2007 and was replaced by officials from AFL Victoria until suitable replacements were found before the start of the 2008 season. At the end of the 2017 season, the NFL was renamed the NFNL to incorporate Netball under the one banner- the NFNL.

Formation of Division Three

In 2008 the NFL added an open-age Netball competition and announced an intention that a third division would be added for the 2009 season with the old 14 team second division to be split into eight and six team divisions, however Kinglake and Wallan both left the league so the NFL did not proceed. In 2009, the NFL stated that a permanent Division Three for 2010 would be dependent on at least one more club joining the league. With St Mary's indicating that they intended to field a senior team in 2010, the NFL announced a stand-alone Division Three to commence from 2010. Reversing an earlier decision, the NFL decided that Division Two would be split during the 2009 season based on ladder position after the 13th round once all teams had played each other once, with the top 8 teams remaining in Division Two and the bottom 6 teams forming Division Three for the remaining games of the season. It was also decided that the newly formed Division Three would play a finals series in 2009, but the premier would not gain promotion to Division Two as these teams had already been relegated for the 2009 season. At the end of Round 13, Diamond Creek, Epping, Fitzroy Stars, Lower Plenty, Macleod, Mernda, Watsonia and Whittlesea formed the top 8 teams and remained in Division Two, whilst Heidelberg West, Hurstbridge, Panton Hill, Parkside, Reservoir and South Morang were the bottom 6 teams and formed the new Division Three.

League details

AFL Victoria Community Championships 
In 2016, the Northern Football Netball League began playing in the AFL Victoria Community Championships for metropolitan and country competitions to challenge each other for the title of best football league in Victoria. In 2016, the league were defeated by the Mornington Peninsula Nepean Football League to be fifth. The next year the league defeated the Western Region Football League and were ranked fourth. In 2018, the league avenged its 2016 defeat by the MPNFL to be ranked second. In 2019, the Northern Football Netball League defeated the Geelong Football League to become the number one ranked league in Victoria.

Key people 
 Chairman – Scott Walker
 CEO – Peter McDougall

Presidents

Secretaries

Senior Competition

Clubs

Division 1

Division 2

Division 3

Promotion and Relegation 
At the end of each year the Premiers of Division 2 and 3 are promoted, while the clubs that finish bottom in Division 1 and 2 are relegated.

Premiership TimelineNote

Division Promotion and Relegation TimelineNote 

Note:
 In 1938, Diamond Creek and Hurstbridge lacked senior players due to WWII. Having a number of boys still wanting to play, they decided to merge their clubs and play as 'Diamond Valley Juniors' against other junior teams in the Melbourne Boys League. In 1939, enough senior players were found to form a team and Diamond Valley Juniors entered a senior team into the DVFL competition from 1939 to 1941. After WWII, Diamond Creek and Hurstbridge returned to playing as separate clubs. 
 In 1987, Watsonia won the Division 2 Premiership, but declined to compete in Division 1 due to concerns regarding financial stability and competitiveness: the DVFL allowed Reservoir-Lakeside (the 1987 runners-up) to be promoted to Division 1 for the 1988 season to avoid a bye.
 In 1997, Reservoir-Lakeside asked to be relegated to Division 2 due to an exodus of players, leaving a nine team Division 1 and a bye for that season: Greensborough avoided relegation since Reservoir-Lakeside had dropped before the season began. At the end of the 1997 season, Reservoir-Lakeside (Div 2) and West Preston (Div 1) merged to become West Preston-Lakeside and played the 1998 season in Division 1.
 In 2015, Reservoir won the Division 3 Premiership, but went into recess before the 2016 season, leaving Division 2 with seven teams and requiring a bye.
 In 2018, Lalor requested relegation to Division 3 due to an exodus of players, so that the club could survive and rebuild. The NFL granted Lalor's request, trading places with Epping who agreed to be promoted from Division 3 to Division 2 for the 2018 season to avoid a bye.
 In 2019, the league decided to move to a ten team Division 1 & 2 and an eight team Division 3 structure for the 2020 season with Old Eltham Collegians's successful transfer from the VAFA into the NFNL's Division 3 for the 2019 season. This decision created a nine team Division 2 and 3 for the 2019 season: the league thus promoted the 2018 Division 3 premier, St Mary's, to Division 2 and allowed the last placed 2018 Division 2 team, Watsonia to avoid relegation. At the conclusion of the 2019 season, Panton Hill were promoted to Division 2 after winning the Division 3 premiership and last placed Epping avoided relegation, thus completing the competition restructure.
 In 2021, the season commenced but was interrupted several times due to Victoria being locked down due to Covid-19 outbreaks. A lengthy lock down occurred at the end of the home and away season which caused the finals series to be cancelled. It was subsequently decided that there would be no promotion or relegation between the divisions, however the Best and Fairest and Leading Goal Kicker awards were presented.

Premiers

Premiership Table

Division 1

Division 2

Division 3

Awards

Division 1

Division 2 

 Player awarded Best on Ground despite playing for the losing team

Division 3

Women's Senior Competition 
The NFNL Women's Senior Competition was established in 2017. As the NFNL was one of the first metropolitan leagues in Melbourne to begin their own senior women's competition, football clubs from the EDFL, EFL, VAFA and WRFL participated in the NFNL until their own leagues established women's competitions.

There is currently no promotion or relegation between the divisions. To ensure a competitive balance each season, the competition is graded, meaning teams are placed on their level of ability rather than on how they performed the previous year.

Clubs

All Divisions

Women's Clubs Currently In Recess

Premiers

Premiership Table

Division 1

Division 2

Division 3

Awards

Division 1

Division 2

Division 3 

Player awarded Best on Ground despite playing for the losing team

Juniors Competition 
The NFNL Juniors Competition has 24 clubs across the boys and girls competitions. The competition comprises age groups from under 9 thorough to under 17. In 2010 the league announced for there to be an under 16 age group which had previously not existed.

Lew Hall Trophy 
The trophy is awarded each year to the club which has the most combined premiership points from the under 13, under 15 and under 17 age groups. The Lew Hall Award changed criteria to become an individual award to acknowledge club and community leadership by a young person.

Clubs

Former Clubs

Former Men's Competition Clubs

Additional Information
 All Blacks Football Club (Folded). A team from Templestowe, the 'All Blacks' were admitted into the Diamond Valley for the 1929 season. It is known that they wore an all-black uniform based upon two small news articles in 1929 where it was reported that the club had lent their strip to the Diamond Valley Football League representative side for their match against the Bourke-Evelyn League as part of the Hartley Shield inter-league competition. The All Blacks were a different team to the current Templestowe Football Club as they played against them in the 1931 and 1932 seasons. They moved to Warringal Park in Heidelberg during the 1930 season and were co-tenants with Old Paradians. They played their final season in 1932 and 'amalgamated' with Heidelberg Football Club in 1933 to play in the VFL Sub-District League.
 Diamond Valley Juniors was a merger between Diamond Creek and Hurstbridge football clubs in 1938 due to a lack of open aged players. The Diamond Valley Juniors played as a junior club only in the Melbourne Boys League in 1938. In 1939, enough senior players were available and they re-entered the DFVL until 1941. The team was dissolved when the DVFL resumed in 1946 with Diamond Creek and Hurstbridge Football Clubs becoming independent once more.
 Plenty Rovers Football Club (The Plenty Rovers FC came about because of a merger between the Mernda & Doreen, they played at the Doreen Recreation Reserve, from 1932 to 1964 (1936–1939, 1946 in the DVFL), until they were forced to move out of Doreen due to powerline extensions, and moved to Mernda Recreation Reserve in Schotters Rd, Mernda, where they changed their name back to the Mernda Football Club in 1965). When Mernda rejoined the DVFL, they changed their jumper from the red and blue Melbourne Football Club design to a red jumper with a blue sash (due to Diamond Creek already wearing the Melbourne Football Club jumper).
 Research Football Club (Club is now solely a junior club, however they do have an alignment with Lower Plenty Football Club). They wore a royal blue jumper with a red hoop and a white hoop either side of it in the style of Footscray Football Club when they played in the Panton Hill Football League but changed to a white jumper with red vertical stripes when they joined the Diamond Valley Football League (Due to North Heidelberg already wearing the bulldogs jumper). As a result of a number of violent on-field altercations, the club was expelled following the 1991 season. The Research Senior Football Club played at Eltham Lower Park, a different venue from the junior football club who still play at Research Park.
 St Andrews-Coburg Football Club (Folded) played in a gold jumper with a royal blue vee in the VAFA, but changed to a blue and yellow jumper, the same as the original West Coast Eagles jumper, when they crossed to the Diamond Valley Football League. St Andrews originally played at Brearley Reserve, Pascoe Vale South but with Coburg Amateurs Senior Football Club going into recess at the end of the 1987 season, St Andrews made the move to De Chene Reserve, Coburg in 1989. As a result of the move, St Andrews then merged with the Coburg Amateurs Junior Football Club to become St Andrews-Coburg.

Former Women's Competition Clubs

Former Junior Competition Clubs

Footnote 
Halfway through the 2009 season, six clubs (including Parkside and Hurstbridge) split from Division 2 in preparation for a third division in 2010. These clubs competed against each other for the rest of the season and Parkside defeated Hurstbridge in the senior grand final with Hurstbridge winning the reserve grand final. As per the announcement of the league at the time the divisions were split, Parkside were not promoted to Division Two.

Main Sources 

Notes

 Diamond Valley Football League Annual Report's from 1976 to 2007
 Diamond Valley Football League Website
 Diamond Valley Football League Clubs
 Diamond Valley Football League Football Record
 Diamond Valley Football League Archives

External links 
 Official Northern Football League Website

Australian rules football competitions in Victoria (Australia)
Northern Football League (Australia)
Netball leagues in Victoria (Australia)